Pigritia ochrocomella is a moth in the family Blastobasidae. It is found in the United States, including Pennsylvania and Maine.

References

Moths described in 1863
Blastobasidae